Stephan "Lillis" Lundh (born November 6, 1959 in Stockholm, Sweden) is a Swedish ice hockey coach.

Stephan's coaching career started in 1989 in Nacka. He was an assistant coach in Djurgården between 1990 and 1998, Tre Kronor and then Malmö IF 1999 to 2004 and Frölunda HC 2004 to November 7, 2006.

References

1959 births
Living people
Swedish ice hockey coaches
Sportspeople from Stockholm
Djurgårdens IF Hockey coaches